Jermaine "Shea" Showers (born January 11, 1974) is a former American football defensive back who played seven seasons in the Arena Football League with the Iowa Barnstormers, New York Dragons, Grand Rapids Rampage and Tampa Bay Storm. He played college football at the University of Florida and attended Santa Fe High School in Alachua, Florida.

Early years
Showers played high school football for the Santa Fe Raiders. He recorded 40 receptions for 711 yards and 11 touchdowns his senior year as the Raider won the Class 3A state title. He also accumulated 90 tackles and five interceptions.

College career
Showers was a member of the Florida Gators from 1992 to 1996.

Professional career
Showers played for the Iowa Barnstormers from 1998 to 2000, earning Second Team All-Arena honors in 1999 and being named to the AFL's All-Rookie Team in 1998. He signed with the Tampa Bay Storm on January 8, 2001. He played for the New York Dragons from 2001 to 2002. Showers was signed by the Grand Rapids Rampage December 10, 2002. He signed with the Tampa Bay Storm on December 16, 2003.

Coaching career
Showers was defensive backs coach at Fort White High School in Fort White, Florida in 2007. He served as head football coach at the Santa Fe High School in Alachua, Florida from 2008 to 2010. He became an assistant coach for the Fort White High School in Fort White, Florida in 2011.

References

External links
 Just Sports Stats

Living people
1974 births
American football defensive backs
American football wide receivers
Florida Gators football players
Grand Rapids Rampage players
Iowa Barnstormers players
New York Dragons players
Tampa Bay Storm players
High school football coaches in Florida
Players of American football from Gainesville, Florida
African-American coaches of American football
African-American players of American football
21st-century African-American sportspeople
20th-century African-American sportspeople